Eunica monima, the dingy purplewing, is a species of tropical brushfoot in the family Nymphalidae, and was described by Caspar Stoll in 1782. It is found in North America.

The MONA or Hodges number for Eunica monima is 4532.

References

 Pelham, Jonathan P. (2008). "A catalogue of the butterflies of the United States and Canada with a complete bibliography of the descriptive and systematic literature". Journal of Research on the Lepidoptera, vol. 40, xiv + 658.

Further reading

External links

 Butterflies and Moths of North America
 NCBI Taxonomy Browser, Eunica monima

Biblidinae
Butterflies described in 1782